Law & Order: Criminal Intent is a video game adaptation of the television series Law & Order: Criminal Intent. It is the fourth title in a series of video games based on the Law & Order franchise.

Plot
The player takes on the role of Detective Robert Goren, voiced by actor Vincent D'Onofrio, and attempts to solve four homicide investigations. As Detective Goren, the player will scrutinize crime scenes, analyze evidence and interview witnesses and suspects. The player will utilize Goren's instincts for interrogation by selecting his psychological approach to each witness and potential suspect. The player will decide if Goren should try to deceive the suspect, intimidate him into talking or take another approach altogether. Captain Deakins, voiced by Jamey Sheridan, provides his streetwise perspective and savvy guidance throughout the course of the investigations. In order to solve each case, the player builds a profile based on real-life criminal profiling techniques to help track down the killers. Detective Hadrian, played by Nick Basta, is a character created specifically for the game, and was not featured in the main show.

Reception

Criminal Intent was met with mixed reception, as GameRankings gave it a score of 58.33%, while Metacritic gave it 56 out of 100.

References

External links
 

2005 video games
Adventure games
Crime investigation simulators
Video games about police officers
Video games based on Law & Order (franchise)
Video games developed in the United States
Video games set in New York City
Windows games
Windows-only games
Mindscape games